This is a list of the 260 episodes for the television version of The Jack Benny Program, as opposed to the radio program of the same name.

Series overview

Episodes

Season 1 (1950–51)

Season 2 (1951–52)

Season 3 (1952–53)

Season 4 (1953–54)

Season 5 (1954–55)

Season 6 (1955–56)

Season 7 (1956–57)

Season 8 (1957–58)

Season 9 (1958–59)

Season 10 (1959–60)

Season 11 (1960–61)

Season 12 (1961–62)

Season 13 (1962–63)

Season 14 (1963–64)

Season 15 (1964–65)

References

External links
 
 

Jack Benny Program
Jack Benny